Line 14 of Xi'an Metro is a rapid transit line in Xi'an.

Opening timeline

Section

West section
The west section from Airport West (T1, T2, T3) to
 opened on 29 September 2019. In January 2021, the operator become Xi'an Metro. In June 2021, it was officially renamed Line 14.

East section

Stations

Notes

References

14